Lynn Hamilton (born April 25, 1930) is an American retired actress whose acting debut came in 1959 in John Cassavetes' Shadows, She is best known for her recurring role as Donna Harris; Fred's girlfriend and later fiancée on the sitcom Sanford and Son (1972 - 1977) and as Verdie Foster on The Waltons. She also appeared on the detective series Mannix in the season 3 episode 13 as the wife of a police detective who hires Mannix to save her son.

Early years
Hamilton was born in Yazoo City, Mississippi, to Nancy and Louis Hamilton and moved to Chicago Heights, Illinois, when she was twelve years old. She attended Bloom High School. She studied acting at Goodman Theatre.

Career 
Hamilton began her career in community theatre in Chicago and debuted on Broadway in Only in America in 1959. She appeared in three other Broadway plays, many Off-Broadway plays and spent three years with the New York Shakespeare Festival.

From 1972 to 1977, after an initial credited one-time appearance in the seventh episode of the series as a landlady, Hamilton starred as Fred Sanford's girlfriend and later fiancée Donna Harris on the television sitcom Sanford and Son. Donna was a nurse and sometimes took care of Fred. When the show returned in 1980 under a reworked title Sanford (TV series), Hamilton was not asked to return and her character was written out of the series. There are many internet claims that she was the younger sister of actress LaWanda Page, who portrayed Esther Anderson on Sanford and Son, confirmed only via LaWanda Page's obituary in the Los Angeles Times. However, they are neither related nor sisters, though they became good friends. In addition to Hamilton's role on Sanford and Son, she also had a recurring role as Verdie Grant Foster on The Waltons, and made numerous appearances in television sitcoms, soap operas and miniseries such as Good Times, 227, Dangerous Women, Generations, Port Charles, The Golden Girls, Gunsmoke (guest starring as ”Mother Tabitha” in the 1969 episode “The Sisters” (S15E14), and Roots: The Next Generations. Hamilton also appeared in the show Barnaby Jones, playing a character named Laura Padget, in episode titled "Sunday: Doomsday" on February 4, 1973. Hamilton also had a recurring role as Judge Fulton on The Practice. Also appeared in an episode of The Rockford Files: The Hammer of C Block (1976) as Eunice Charles Bingham.

Personal life
Hamilton was married to poet and playwright Frank Jenkins for 49 years, from November 1964 until his death in August 2014. LaWanda Page, who costarred with Hamilton on Sanford and Son had a younger sister coincidentally also named "Lynn Hamilton". This caused a rumor that the two actresses were sisters. Series lead Demond Wilson confirmed the rumor to be false in 2016.

Filmography

References

External links

 
 

Living people
African-American actresses
American film actresses
American soap opera actresses
American television actresses
20th-century American actresses
Actresses from Mississippi
People from Yazoo City, Mississippi
21st-century American actresses
American stage actresses
20th-century African-American women
20th-century African-American people
21st-century African-American women
21st-century African-American people
1930 births